Christopher Evans (born January 29, 1991) is an American professional basketball player for Rapid București of the Liga Națională. Standing at 2.03 m (6'8"), he plays the power forward position. After playing five years of college basketball at Coastal Carolina, Wabash Valley and Kent State, Evans entered the 2013 NBA draft, but he was not selected in the draft's two rounds.

High school career
Evans played high school basketball at Petersburg in Petersburg, Virginia. Was rated the 17th best junior college player in the country at the start of the season by Rivals.com. At Petersburg High School he was named Second Team All-State and was rated the 73rd-best shooting guard in the country. In the 2008–2009 he averaged 15.3 points, 8.4 rebounds and 2.4 assists per game and helped lead his team to a 30–1 record and a berth in the Group AAA state semifinals.

College career
As a freshman at Coastal Carolina, the Region 24 Player of the Year also took home All-Tournament honors at the NJCAA National Tournament where he averaged 21.7 points over three games. As a sophomore, he averaged 19.5 points, 8.2 rebounds and 2.0 assists per game while leading Wabash Valley to a 29–7 record and a regional title in the 2010–2011 season. On 2011 Evans was transferred to Kent State after playing the previous two seasons for Wabash Valley Community College where he earned first-team NJCAA Division I All-American honors.

Professional career
After going undrafted in the 2013 NBA draft, Evans joined Aries Trikala of the Greek Basket League. With Trikala, he was the second best scorer and the fourth best rebounder of the league. During his rookie season with Trikala, he averaged 16.5 points, 7.3 rebounds and 1.3 assists per game.

The following year, he joined Pallacanestro Trapani. On December he left the team and on January he joined Scafati Basket until the end of the season.

On July 21, 2015, Evans signed with Hapoel Tel Aviv of the Israeli Premier League. On December 7, 2015, he was waived by the team. On January 14, 2016, he joined Ironi Nahariya but he left the team after only two months.

During the 2016–17 season, Evans returned to the United States and joined Canton Charge. He was waived from the team on March 9, 2017, due to a season ending injury. On April 6, 2017, Evans joined Gimnasia de Comodoro of the Liga Nacional de Básquet. On September 8, he returned to Europe and signed with AS Monaco of the LNB Pro A and the Champions League.

On August 2, 2018, Evans signed a one-year deal with Herbalife Gran Canaria of the Liga ACB and the EuroLeague.

On January 10, 2019, Evans signed a 6 months deal with Turkish side Pınar Karşıyaka.

On August 2, 2019, he has signed with Orléans Loiret Basket of the French Pro A.

On August 10, 2020, he signed with Virtus Roma of the Italian Serie A (LBA).

After Virtus Roma's withdrawal from the Serie A due to financial problems, Evans, like all the Roma players, was made free agent.

On October 4, 2021, he has signed with Shahrdari Gorgan of the Iranian Super League.

On August 4, 2022, he has signed with Rapid București of the Liga Națională.

References

External links
Kent State bio
RealGM.com Profile

1991 births
Living people
American expatriate basketball people in Argentina
American expatriate basketball people in Greece
American expatriate basketball people in Israel
American expatriate basketball people in Italy
American expatriate basketball people in Monaco
American expatriate basketball people in Spain
American expatriate basketball people in Turkey
American men's basketball players
Aries Trikala B.C. players
AS Monaco Basket players
Basketball players from Virginia
Canton Charge players
CB Gran Canaria players
Coastal Carolina Chanticleers men's basketball players
Gimnasia y Esgrima de Comodoro Rivadavia basketball players
Hapoel Tel Aviv B.C. players
Ironi Nahariya players
Karşıyaka basketball players
Kent State Golden Flashes men's basketball players
Liga ACB players
Orléans Loiret Basket players
Pallacanestro Trapani players
Power forwards (basketball)
Scafati Basket players
Sportspeople from Chesapeake, Virginia
Wabash Valley Warriors men's basketball players